Instrumentals is an album by Ricky Skaggs and Kentucky Thunder, released through Skaggs Family Records on August 1, 2006. In 2007, the album won the group the Grammy Award for Best Bluegrass Album.

Track listing
 "Going to Richmond" – 3:41
 "Missing Vassar" – 4:25
 "Wayward to Hayward" – 5:22
 "Montana Slim" – 3:32
 "Crossing the Briney" – 7:07
 "Crossville" – 3:48
 "Gallatin Rag" – 4:08
 "Dawg's Breath" – 5:12
 "Spam Jelly" – 3:30
 "Goin' to the Ceili" – 3:33
 "Polk City" – 3:14

Personnel 
 Ricky Skaggs – lead vocals, mandolin, archtop guitar (1, 3-11), Clawhammer-style banjo (1), electric guitar (2, 3, 8), percussion (2), high-string guitar (5), mandocello (5)
 Jeff Taylor – accordion (1, 5, 6, 10), whistle (5), penny whistle (10)
 Cody Kilby – rhythm guitars
 Jim Mills – banjo (1-4, 6, 8-11)
 Mark Fain – bass
 Andy Leftwich – fiddle
 Andy Statman – clarinet (7)

Additional musicians
 The Nashville String Machine – orchestra (5)
 Jim Gray – orchestrations and conductor (5)
 Carl Gorodetzky – contractor (5)

Production 
 Lee Groitzsch – recording, mixing 
 Brent King – recording, mixing 
 Andrew Mendelson – mastering 
 Christoph Giese – photography

Chart performance

References

External links
 Ricky Skaggs' official site

2006 albums
Ricky Skaggs albums
Collaborative albums
Grammy Award for Best Bluegrass Album